Luis Esteban Gómez Carreño (26 January 1865, isla Guar – 6 January 1930) was a Chilean naval officer. 
Having joined the navy aged 15 on board the Huáscar, he later served as squadron commander in chief, director of the Naval School and Minister of War and the Navy under the September Junta. He was involved in a car accident on one of the bends of the 'El Olivar' road between Quilpué and Viña del Mar on 1 January 1930 and died 5 days later. He is buried in Cemetery Number 2 in Valparaíso.

1865 births
1930 deaths
Chilean Ministers of Defense
Chilean Navy officers
Chilean admirals
Chilean Navy personnel of the War of the Pacific
19th-century Chilean Navy personnel